A Christmas Carol: The Musical is a 2004 American musical television film based on the 1843 novella of the same name by Charles Dickens, which also inspired a 1994 stage musical by Alan Menken and Lynn Ahrens.

Directed by Arthur Allan Seidelman and written by Ahrens, the film stars Kelsey Grammer, Jesse L. Martin, Jane Krakowski, Jennifer Love Hewitt, Geraldine Chaplin, and Jason Alexander. The film first premiered on November 28, 2004, on the NBC television network.

Plot 

On Christmas Eve in London, Ebenezer Scrooge, a miserly moneylender at a counting house, does not share the merriment of Christmas. He declines an offer from recently widowed Mr. Smythe and his daughter Grace to pay for Mrs. Smythe's funeral, voicing his support for the prisons and workhouses for the poor, declining his nephew Fred's invitation to Christmas dinner, and reluctantly accepts his loyal employee Bob Cratchit's request to have Christmas Day off since there will be no business for Scrooge on the day. As Scrooge leaves for home, he encounters three individuals—a candle-lighter, a barker and an old blind woman—and declines their offers to collect money for charity. In his house, Scrooge is visited by the ghost of his deceased business partner, Jacob Marley, who warns Scrooge to repent or be condemned in the afterlife like he was, informing him that three spirits will visit him during the night.

At one o'clock, Scrooge is visited by the fairy-like Ghost of Christmas Past, who takes him back in time to his childhood and early adult life. They visit the time when his father John William was sentenced for not paying debts, his lonely days as a boot factory worker, and then his time as an employee under Mr. Fezziwig. Fezziwig throws a Christmas party, where Scrooge befriends and is engaged to a young woman named Emily. However, the Ghost shows Scrooge how he and Marley chose money over Fezziwig and how Emily later left Scrooge after realising how hard-hearted he has become. The Ghost finally shows him when Marley dies after overworking himself. A devastated Scrooge dismisses the Ghost as he returns to the present.

At two o'clock, Scrooge is visited by the merry Ghost of Christmas Present who shows him the joys and wonder of Christmas Day. Scrooge and the Ghost next visit Bob Cratchit's house, learning his family is content with their dinner, as Scrooge takes pity on Bob's ill son, Tiny Tim. The Ghost then comments that Tiny Tim might not survive until next Christmas. Scrooge and the Ghost visit Fred's house, where Fred hopes that someday his uncle will join them as family. The Ghost shows him the evils of "Ignorance" and "Want" before he disappears and Scrooge finds himself back in his house.

At three o'clock, the Ghost of Christmas Future approaches Scrooge, appearing as a silent woman under a beggar's robes. The Ghost takes Scrooge into the future of 1850. In a cemetery, Scrooge recognizes his deceased self as his housekeeper Mrs. Mopps trades his possessions to a fence named Old Joe. Scrooge then discovers Tiny Tim has died and when the Ghost points out his own grave, he vows to change his ways. Scrooge is surrounded by the Cratchits, Grace and the spirits of his mother and sister, which encourage him to feel love and compassion again. Scrooge's grave begins to crack, hinting that the future already has begun to change, and Scrooge, misunderstanding this to be a sign he is doomed, tries to run as the Ghost of Christmas Future throws his bed curtains over him to return him to his bed.

Finding it is Christmas Day, a gleeful Scrooge decides to surprise Bob's family with a turkey dinner, and ventures out to spread happiness and joy throughout London. After paying off Mr. Smythe's debt, Scrooge once again encounters the candle-lighter, barker, and blind woman—who are the Ghosts in their human forms—and thanks them. Scrooge goes to the Cratchit house, at first putting on a stern demeanor, and then revealing he intends to raise Bob's salary and pay off his mortgage. Scrooge then goes to Fred's house to celebrate Christmas with the neighborhood and the Cratchits.

Cast 
 Kelsey Grammer as Ebenezer Scrooge
 Jane Krakowski as Ghost of Christmas Past / Lamp-Lighter
 Jesse L. Martin as Ghost of Christmas Present / Sandwich Board Man
 Geraldine Chaplin as Ghost of Christmas Future / Blind Old Hag
 Jennifer Love Hewitt as Emily
 Jason Alexander as Jacob Marley
 Edward Gower as Bob Cratchit
 Linzi Hateley as Mrs. Cratchit
 Jacob Collier (Moriarty) as Tiny Tim
 Julian Ovenden as Fred Anderson
 Julie Alannagh-Brighten as Sally Anderson
 Ruthie Henshall as Mrs. Scrooge (Scrooge's mother)
 Mike Kelly as John William Scrooge (Scrooge's father)
 Lea-Verity White as Fan Scrooge Anderson
 Sheila Reid as Mrs. Mops
 Ian McLarnon as Mr. Smythe
 Emily Deamer as Grace Smythe
 Brian Bedford as Mr. Fezziwig
 Claire Moore as Mrs. Fezziwig
 Steven Miller as Young Ebenezer Scrooge

The adaptation 
Lyricist Lynn Ahrens wrote the teleplay, based on her and Mike Ockrent's book for the original Madison Square Garden stage musical. Filming took place in Budapest. The score contains 22 songs, also adapted from the stage. The opening number, "Jolly Good Time", is a more jovial reworking of the first two numbers in the stage version, "The Years Are Passing By" and "Jolly, Rich, and Fat". In the next number, "Nothing to Do With Me", Scrooge first encounters the three ghosts of Christmas in their physical guises as a lamp-lighter (Christmas Past), a charity show-barker (Christmas Present), and a blind beggar woman (Christmas Future). The scene where Scrooge's long-suffering employee Bob Cratchit buys a Christmas chicken with his son Tiny Tim in the song "You Mean More to Me" appears as well.

The visit of the ghost of Jacob Marley becomes a large-scale production number ("Link By Link"), featuring a half-dozen singing, dancing spirits presented with various levels of makeup and special effects. One of these ghosts in this version is known to be an old colleague of Scrooge and Marley's, Mr. Haynes, who was said to be "mean to the bone", resulting in his charred skeleton. Other puns include a headless spirit who wanted to get ahead, a man with a safe full of coins in his chest who "never had a heart" and a man carrying a box that contains his arm because he "never lent a hand".

The Ghost of Christmas Past sings "The Lights of Long Ago", a number reinforcing her signature theme of illuminating Scrooge's worldview. One notable departure from Dickens' novella in this portion of the film is its depiction of Ebenezer Scrooge's father, identified as John William Scrooge, being sentenced to debtors' prison while his horrified family looks on (a scene inspired by events from Dickens' own childhood).

The Ghost of Christmas Present gets two numbers, "Abundance and Charity" and "Christmas Together", in which he makes his point that Christmas is a time for celebration, generosity, and fellowship. The former takes place at a fantastical version of the charity show he was seen promoting on Christmas Eve, and the latter whisks Scrooge on a tour of London that includes the homes of his nephew Fred, his clerk Bob Cratchit, and Mr. Smythe, a recently widowed client of Scrooge's lending house.

Unlike the faceless phantom that embodies Christmas Future in most versions of A Christmas Carol (including the book), this film features a mute sorceress figure clad in white (a transmogrification of the blind hag who appears on Christmas Eve). The entire sequence of Christmas Future plays out in song ("Dancing On Your Grave", "You Mean More to Me (Reprise)", and "Yesterday, Tomorrow, and Today"), culminating in Scrooge's awakening in his bedroom on Christmas morning.

"What a Day, What a Sky" serves as a musical bookend to "Nothing to Do With Me", dramatizing Scrooge's new outlook as he races through the streets of London making amends. The film concludes with a reprise of "Christmas Together" featuring the entire cast.

Reception 
Brian Lowry of Variety called the film the 37th-best production of A Christmas Carol, and the third-best musical version behind Albert Finney in Scrooge and Mr. Magoo. Lowry had a positive opinion of the visuals and special effects but was critical of musical numbers in the film. Despite his mixed feelings about the acting of Kelsey Grammer and Jason Alexander, Lowry praised the performances of Jane Krakowski and Jesse L. Martin. Paul Brownfield of the Los Angeles Times praised Grammer's performance of Scrooge. He also said the actors performing in period costumes gave the film an air of silliness that he found enjoyable if unintended. In addition, Brownfield praised the special effects, the musical numbers and Geraldine Chaplin's acting.

See also 
 List of Christmas films
 List of ghost films
 Adaptations of A Christmas Carol

References

External links 

 
 
 

2004 television films
2004 films
2004 drama films
2000s American films
2000s Christmas drama films
2000s English-language films
2000s fantasy drama films
2000s musical drama films
2000s musical fantasy films
American Christmas drama films
American drama television films
American fantasy drama films
American musical drama films
American musical fantasy films
Christmas television films
Fantasy television films
Films based on adaptations
Films based on A Christmas Carol
Films based on musicals
Films directed by Arthur Allan Seidelman
Films scored by Alan Menken
Films shot in Budapest
Ghosts in television
Musical television films
NBC network original films
Sonar Entertainment films
Television films based on books
Television shows based on A Christmas Carol